Dato' Dr. Tan Kee Kwong (born 1947) is a Malaysian politician of Chinese origin. He served as a Member of Parliament for Wangsa Maju representing People's Justice Party (PKR) of Pakatan Harapan coalition between 2013 and 2018. Previously, he was the Parti Gerakan Rakyat Malaysia (Gerakan) Member of Parliament for Segambut for three terms from 1995 to 2008 and was the deputy minister of Land and Cooperative Development from 1999 to 2004 in the Barisan Nasional (BN) federal government. He later joined PKR  in 2008 and currently sat on the party disciplinary board.

Early life and professional career
Tan is born and raised in Kuala Lumpur. His father, Tan Sri Tan Chee Khoon is the founder of the Gerakan party and the former official leader of opposition between 1964 and 1978.

Tan was educated at the Victoria Institution, Kuala Lumpur, from 1960 to 1966. He was its School Captain in his final year. A medical doctor by profession, Tan graduated from University of Malaya and worked in United Kingdom during 1977 and 1981. He then worked for two years in Southern Sudan, practising community medicine with a voluntary Christian NGO. He later returned to Malaysia and started a private clinic on Jalan Tuanku Abdul Rahman in Kuala Lumpur.

Politics 
In 1995, he joined Gerakan two month before the general election and Tan Sri Dato' Alex Lee nominated him as a candidate in the new created parliamentary seat of Segambut.  He was elected as Member of Parliament for Segambut in the 1995 election and was re-elected in 1999 and 2004 elections.

Tan did not contest in the March 2008 general election. He later  quit Gerakan and joined PKR in August 2008. In the 2013 election, he contested and was elected as a Member of Parliament from Wangsa Maju on PKR ticket.

Election results

Honours
  :
  Companion of the Order of the Defender of State (DMPN) – Dato' (2004)

References

External links 
 Facebook page of Tan Kee Kwong

Kuala Lumpur politicians
Members of the Dewan Rakyat
Malaysian Methodists
Former Parti Gerakan Rakyat Malaysia politicians
People's Justice Party (Malaysia) politicians
Malaysian people of Teochew descent
Malaysian politicians of Chinese descent
Living people
1947 births